Savalia (Greek: Σαβάλια) is a village in the municipal unit of Amaliada, Elis, southern Greece. The Greek National Road 9 (Patras–Pyrgos) passes southwest of the village. The railway from Patras to Pyrgos passes northeast of the village. Its population is 1,206 (2011 census).

External links
Savalia page 18 (in Greek)
GTP - Savalia

See also
List of settlements in Elis

References

Populated places in Elis